Otara Hill (also Te Puke o Tara or Smales Mount) is one of the volcanoes in the Auckland volcanic field. Its scoria cone reached 89 m above sea level (around 59 m higher than the surrounding land) before it was quarried away. The hill was the site of a pā named “Te Puke Ō Tara” meaning ‘hill belonging to Tara’, who was a Ngāi Tai Rangatira (or Māori Chief) of the area.

Like many Auckland volcanoes, Otara Hill has a notable tuff ring. It is located between Green Hill and Hampton Park.
Green Hill and Otara Hill were together referred to as Bessy Bell and Mary Gray after an old Scottish ballad.

References

City of Volcanoes: A geology of Auckland - Searle, Ernest J.; revised by Mayhill, R.D.; Longman Paul, 1981. First published 1964. .
Volcanoes of Auckland: A Field Guide. Hayward, B.W.; Auckland University Press, 2019, 335 pp. .

External links
  Aerial view looking north-east showing north side of Otara Hill in 1949
 View of Smales Mountain being quarried, around 1965.

Auckland volcanic field